The Kremsbrücke Pressingberg bridge is the longest bridge in Austria at . 

The bridge is situated in Kremsbrücke, Carinthia, Austria. It is actually two cantilever truss bridges end to end (the Kremsbrücke and Pressingberg bridges). Construction took three years (1978-1980).

The bridge carries the A10 Tauern Autobahn, which connects Salzburg to Spittal, across the Krems valley. The roadway is 84 feet (25.5 m) wide, resting on a box girder 24.6 feet (7.5 m) wide and 16 feet (5 m) deep, and is divided into four traffic lanes.

References

Cantilever bridges
Truss bridges
Bridges in Austria